Clarence "Chris" Newton (February 3, 1899 in Toronto – October 23, 1979) was a Canadian lightweight boxer who was active during the 1920s. He was affiliated with Riverside Athletic Club in Toronto. He won the bronze medal at the 1920 Summer Olympics in Antwerp, Belgium.

1920 Olympic results
Below are the results of Clarence Newton, a Canadian lightweight boxer who competed at the 1920 Antwerp Olympics:

 Round of 16: defeated Johan Jensen (Denmark)
 Quarterfinal: defeated Johan Saeterhaug (Norway)
 Semifinal: lost to Gotfred Johansen (Denmark)
 Bronze Medal Bout: defeated Richard Beland (South Africa)

Professional career

From 1920 to 1929, Newton fought professionally in Canada and the United States 66 times, earning the alias "Old Warrior". A highlight of his professional career came on February 21, 1927, when he defeated Chris Graham by way of knockout to become the Canadian lightweight champion.

References

External References
 Canadian Olympic Committee
 Boxing Records Archive

1899 births
1979 deaths
Boxers from Toronto
Lightweight boxers
Olympic boxers of Canada
Boxers at the 1920 Summer Olympics
Olympic bronze medalists for Canada
Olympic medalists in boxing
Canadian male boxers
Medalists at the 1920 Summer Olympics